Dolly Tree (17 March 1899 – 17 May 1962) was an English illustrator, actress and costume designer who during the 1930s and 1940s designed dresses for Myrna Loy, Jean Harlow, Rosalind Russell, Maureen O'Sullivan and Judy Garland among others in addition to costuming historical dramas such as David Copperfield (1935) and  A Tale of Two Cities (1935).

Biography

Born in Westbury-on-Trym in Bristol in 1899 as Dorothy Marian Isbell, the daughter of Charles Edwin Isbell (1863–1942), a solicitor, and Bertha Marian (née Keith-Williams) (1874–1947). At an early age she discovered an aptitude for drawing before being drawn towards a career on the stage. In 1912 her family relocated to London and she began her career as an artist after seeing the play Vanity Fair at the Palace Theatre in 1916. Of the play she later wrote, ‘I was fascinated by the wonderful dancing and art of Regine Flory and admired her so much that I started to design a special poster of her, really to amuse myself, based on my recollections of this vivid artist seen across the footlights.’ A friend took her drawing to Sir Alfred Butt who bought it and gave her a two-year contract (c1917-1918) to design posters and programme covers for of all his shows including The Boy (1917), The Beauty Spot (1917), Going Up (1918), Telling the Tale (1918), The Latest Craze (1919), The Kiss Call (1919), Very Good Eddie (1919) and Hello America (1919). Her comic illustrations also appeared in various British newspapers and magazines.

Between 1915 and 1918 Dolly Tree appeared in five British silent films as an actress. In the United Kingdom her career as a costume designer began in the 1920s on various cabaret shows in London in particular; in 1923 she collaborated on her first film, Woman to Woman, directed by Graham Cutts and with Alfred Hitchcock as the co-screenwriter, artistic director and assistant director. Her work became popular in Paris where she became the first English person and the first woman to design for the Folies Bergère.

In 1926 she moved to the United States, first working in New York where she created the costumes for the 1928 Broadway play Diamond Lil starring Mae West. She then went to Hollywood where she was involved in designing for 175 American films, firstly for Fox Studios (1929–1931) and then for Metro-Goldwyn-Mayer (1931–1942), mainly as a designer of dresses, among others alongside Adrian. In 1931 while working at Fox Studios she met and married the American Naval officer Thomas Kimes. The marriage was a happy one, but his career in the Navy kept them apart and they divorced in 1940. After her divorce Tree began to drink heavily which led to her leaving MGM in 1942 (this is not the case – she left MGM to work for a wholesale company – see the biography Dolly Tree: A Dream of Beauty) and returning to Fox Studios where she married her second husband, Don E. Whiteford. However, this marriage also did not work and they quickly  divorced, which drove Tree further into alcoholism. Her second divorce, her heavy drinking and the death of her father in 1942 led to her becoming increasing unreliable and losing her job.

Dolly Tree died aged 63 at the Pilgrim State Hospital in New York in 1962. In her will she left £757 to Arthur Thomas Isbell, a retired shopkeeper, and Edith Mary Kelynack (1894–1971) in her native United Kingdom.

Partial filmography

As actress
1915 : Love in a Wood
1915 : From Shopgirl to Duchess – Tilly
1915 : The Disorder of the Bath
1916 : Two Lancashire Lasses in London
1918 : Hindle Wakes – Mary Hollins

As costume designer

1923 : Woman to Woman
1923 : The Woman Dancer
1930 : Just Imagine
1931 : Bad Girl
1932 : Almost Married
1934 : The Public Enemy
1934 : Stamboul Quest 
1934 : Evelyn Prentice
1934 : The Gay Bride
1934 : The Thin Man 
1935 : David Copperfield 
1935 : A Night at the Opera
1935 : Whipsaw
1935 : Public Hero No. 1
1935 : A Tale of Two Cities
1936 : Riffraf
1936 : Trouble for Two
1936: The Garden Murder Case
1936 : The Unguarded Hour
1936 : His Brother's Wife 
1936 : Fury
1936 : Suzy 
1936 : Libeled Lady
1936 : After the Thin Man
1936 : The Devil-Doll
1936 : The Robin Hood of El Dorado
1937 : Rosalie 
1937 : A Day at the Races
1937 : The Good Earth 
1938 : Arsène Lupin Returns
1938 : Port of Seven Seas
1938 : Too Hot to Handle
1938 : Hold That Kiss 
1938 : Spring Madness
1938 : The Girl Downstairs
1938 : Test Pilot 
1939 : At the Circus 
1939 : Babes in Arms 
1939 : Miracles for Sale
1939 : Another Thin Man 
1939 : Blackmail
1940 : Young Tom Edison
1940 : Strike up the Band
1940 : Little Nellie Kelly 
1940 : Flight Command 
1940 : Andy Hardy Meets Debutante
1942 : Tales of Manhattan
1942 : Thunder Birds
1942 : The Loves of Edgar Allan Poe
1942 : Ten Gentlemen from West Point

References

Please see the illustrated Biography Dolly Tree: A Dream of Beauty by Gary Chapman published in 2017.

External links
Dolly Tree on Internet Movie Database
 W.H. Crain Costume and Scene Design Collection at the Harry Ransom Center

1899 births
1962 deaths
People from Westbury-on-Trym
Theatre people from Bristol
People from New York City
English illustrators
English cartoonists
English silent film actresses
British costume designers
British fashion designers
20th-century English actresses